Bullion is a surname. Notable people with the surname include:

Angélique Bullion, French benefactress influential in the foundation of Quebec
Laura Bullion (1876 – 1961), American female outlaw of the Old West
Stéphane Bullion (born 1980), French Etoile dancer of the Paris Opera Ballet
Claude de Bullion (1569 – 1640), French aristocrat and politician

Fictional characters:

French-language surnames